The terminology of algebraic geometry changed drastically during the twentieth century, with the introduction of the general methods, initiated by David Hilbert and the Italian school of algebraic geometry in the beginning of the century, and later formalized by André Weil, Jean-Pierre Serre and Alexander Grothendieck. Much of the classical terminology, mainly based on case study, was simply abandoned, with the result that books and papers written before this time can be hard to read. This article lists some of this classical terminology, and describes some of the changes in conventions.

 translates many of the classical terms in algebraic geometry into scheme-theoretic terminology.

Conventions 

The change in terminology from around 1948 to 1960 is not the only difficulty in understanding classical algebraic geometry. There was also a lot of background knowledge and assumptions, much of which has now changed. This section lists some of these changes.

 In classical algebraic geometry, adjectives were often used as nouns: for example, "quartic" could also be short for "quartic curve" or "quartic surface".
 In classical algebraic geometry, all curves, surfaces, varieties, and so on came with fixed embeddings into projective space, whereas in scheme theory they are more often considered as abstract varieties. For example, a Veronese surface was not just a copy of the projective plane, but a copy of the projective plane together with an embedding into projective 5-space.
 Varieties were often considered only up to birational isomorphism, whereas in scheme theory they are usually considered up to biregular isomorphism. 
 Until circa 1950, many of the proofs in classical algebraic geometry were incomplete (or occasionally just wrong). In particular authors often did not bother to check degenerate cases.
 Words (such as azygetic or bifid) were sometimes formed from Latin or Greek roots without further explanation, assuming that readers would use their classical education to figure out the meaning.

 Definitions in classical algebraic geometry were often somewhat vague, and it is futile to try to find the precise meaning of some of the older terms because many of them never had a precise meaning. In practice this did not matter much when the terms were only used to describe particular examples, as in these cases their meaning was usually clear: for example, it was obvious what the 16 tropes of a Kummer surface were, even if "trope" was not precisely defined in general.
 Algebraic geometry was often implicitly done over the complex numbers (or sometimes the real numbers).
 Readers were often assumed to know classical (or synthetic) projective geometry, and in particular to have a thorough knowledge of conics, and authors would use terminology from this area without further explanation.
 Several terms, such as "Abelian group", "complete", "complex", "flat", "harmonic", "homology", "monoid", "normal", "pole", "regular", now have meanings that are unrelated to their original meanings. Other terms, such as "circle", have their meanings tacitly changed to work in complex projective space; for example, a circle in complex algebraic geometry is a conic passing through the circular points at infinity and has underlying topological space a 2-sphere rather than a 1-sphere.
 Sometimes capital letters are tacitly understood to stand for points, and small letters for lines or curves.

Symbols

A

B

C

D

E 

env

F

G

H

I

J

K

L

M

N

O

P

Q

R

S

T

U

V

W

XYZ

See also 

 Glossary of algebraic geometry
 Glossary of arithmetic and Diophantine geometry
 Glossary of commutative algebra
 Glossary of differential geometry and topology
 Glossary of invariant theory
 Glossary of Riemannian and metric geometry
 Glossary of scheme theory
 List of complex and algebraic surfaces
 List of surfaces
 List of curves

References 

 
 
 
 
 
 
 
 
 
 
 
 
 
 
 
 
 
 
 

 
History of geometry
Glossaries of mathematics
Wikipedia glossaries using description lists